Ribeyro is a surname. Notable people with the surname include:

 Julio Ramón Ribeyro (1929–1994), Peruvian writer
 Héctor García Ribeyro (1909–1963), Peruvian politician

See also
 Ribeiro